Sven Beuckert (born 12 December 1973) is a German professional footballer who played as a goalkeeper. He works at his former club MSV Duisburg as goalkeeping coach.

Career
Beuckert was born in Stollberg, Saxony. He joined MSV Duisburg in the summer of 2003, playing with them two seasons in the second German division. Union as cup finalists of the 2000–01 season (losing against Champions League entrant Schalke 04) were allowed to represent Germany in the 2001–02 UEFA Cup, where they made it to the second round. Beuckert was then their first choice keeper.

After retiring
After retiring in 2009, Beuckert worked as assistant coach of the amateur team of MSV Duisburg in 2011 until 2012.  In November 2011, Beuckert got a new role at the club, and it was as goalkeeping coach this time.

External links

  
 

1973 births
Living people
People from Stollberg
FC Erzgebirge Aue players
Bundesliga players
2. Bundesliga players
Association football goalkeepers
German footballers
MSV Duisburg players
1. FC Union Berlin players
Footballers from Saxony
East German footballers
People from Bezirk Karl-Marx-Stadt